Bird's-nest fern is a common name applied to several related species of epiphytic ferns in the genus Asplenium. They grow in a tight, nest-like clump with a lingulate leaf rosette.

Species known as bird's nest fern include:
A. nidus (bird's-nest fern)
A. australasicum (crow's-nest fern)
A. antiquum 
A. cymbifolium 
A. serratum (wild bird's-nest fern)

Asplenium
Epiphytes
House plants